Jaclyn Narracott (born 5 November 1990) is an Australian skeleton racer who competes on the Skeleton World Cup circuit.  She began international skeleton competition in 2012 when she joined the Australian national team; in 2011 she competed in bobsleigh for two European Cup races.  Narracott has competed on the World Cup, the top level of international skeleton, since 2014; prior to that she competed on the European and North American Cups.  She slides on a Bromley sled, and lives and trains in Bath, England, with the British bobsleigh and skeleton athletes.  Australian Olympic track and bobsleigh athlete Paul Narracott is her uncle. She is in a relationship with British skeleton slider Dom Parsons.

Narracott is the first Australian athlete to earn an Olympic medal in skeleton, after winning the silver medal at the 2022 Winter Olympics in Beijing. This also marked Australia's first medal in any sliding sport at the Winter Olympics. Additionally, Narracott's result lifted Australia's medal tally at Beijing to 4, the highest medal tally Australia has ever achieved at a Winter Olympics.

Notable results
At the IBSF World Championships 2017 in Königssee, Narracott finished 17th, matching her ranking from 2016.  Her best World Championship result was 16th, in 2015.  Her best World Cup result was a first place in 2022. In 2017–18, she finished 18th in World Cup points and 21st in overall ranking, which earned Australia the continental quota spot for Oceania, and Narracott was subsequently selected to the Australian Olympic Team for the 2018 Winter Olympics in Pyeongchang. 

Narracott was selected again for 2022 Winter Olympics in Beijing, where she went on to win the silver medal.

References

External links
 

1990 births
Australian female skeleton racers
Living people
Team Bath winter athletes
Skeleton racers at the 2018 Winter Olympics
Skeleton racers at the 2022 Winter Olympics
Olympic skeleton racers of Australia
Medalists at the 2022 Winter Olympics
Olympic medalists in skeleton
Olympic silver medalists for Australia